The 1953 World Table Tennis Championships – Corbillon Cup (women's team) was the 13th edition of the women's team championship. 

Romania won the gold medal defeating England 3–0 in the final. Austria and Hungary won bronze medals after finishing second in their respective groups.

Medalists

Final tables

Group A

Group B

Final

See also
List of World Table Tennis Championships medalists

References

-
1953 in women's table tennis